The Jean Bowring Show is an Australian television cooking show that aired on Melbourne station HSV-7 from 1957 to 1960. At one point it aired in a 15-minute timeslot, but later became a 30-minute series. 

The Jean Bowring show is notable as an early attempt by Australian television at producing programming aimed at women, along with series like HSV-7's Interior Decoration (with Joyce Turner) and ABC's Women's World (with Joy Wren).

It is not known if any kinescope recordings exist of the series.  During the 1950s/1960s in Australia, daytime series were rarely considered worth keeping after broadcast.

References

External links

Seven Network original programming
Australian cooking television series
1957 Australian television series debuts
1960 Australian television series endings
Black-and-white Australian television shows
English-language television shows